Craig Stuart Andrew McCall (born 19 July 1996) is a Scottish footballer who last played as a midfielder for South Georgia Tormenta in the USL League One.

Career

Youth, College and Amateur
McCall played with the academy sides at Bradford City and Motherwell.

After been released by Motherwell, McCall moved to the United States to play college soccer at Eastern Florida State College, where he made 36 appearances, scoring 7 goals and tallying 13 assists over two seasons.

In 2017 and early 2018, McCall returned to United Kingdom to play with lower league sides Edusport Academy in the Lowland Football League and English Northern Counties East Football League Premier Division Knaresborough Town and their reserve side.

McCall went back to the United States in 2018 to play two further seasons of college soccer at Florida Institute of Technology, making 31 appearances, scoring a single goal and creating 10 assists for the Panthers.

Following college, McCall spent a season in the USL League Two with South Georgia Tormenta FC 2.

Professional
On 9 December 2020, McCall signed his first professional contract with USL League One side South Georgia Tormenta ahead of their 2021 season. He made his professional debut on 24 April 2021, appearing as a 78th-minute substitute during a 2–0 loss to Union Omaha.

Personal life 
Craig is the son of former Everton, Rangers, Bradford City, Sheffield United and Scotland international Stuart McCall; his grandfather Andy McCall was also a professional footballer.

References

External links
 
 Profile at EFSC Athletics
 Profile at Florida Tech Athletics

1996 births
Living people
Association football midfielders
Scottish footballers
Scottish expatriate footballers
Scottish expatriate sportspeople in the United States
Expatriate soccer players in the United States
Caledonian Braves F.C. players
Knaresborough Town A.F.C. players
Tormenta FC players
USL League One players
USL League Two players